Marin Đurica (born 17 September 1991) is a Croatian handballer who plays as a goalkeeper for TuS Ferndorf.

He played for RK Zamet from 2008 to 2017 in the Croatian Premier League. In 2012 and 2016, he competed in the EHF Cup.

Honours

Club
RK Zamet
Croatian Cup
Finalist (1): 2012

RK Maribor Branik
Slovenian Supercup
Finalist (1): 2017

Individual
Best saves percentage in the 2013–14 Croatian Premier Handball League – 39,7%
Best saves total from 9m in the 2013–14 Croatian Premier Handball League – 57,5%

References

External links
 Player Info in European competitions

1991 births
Living people
Handball players from Rijeka
Croatian male handball players
RK Zamet players
Expatriate handball players
Croatian expatriate sportspeople in Slovenia
Croatian expatriate sportspeople in Germany